Linda Maria Baros (born 6 August 1981 in Bucharest) is a French-language poet, translator and literary critic, one of the most powerful new voices on today's poetry scene (the famous French literary award Prix Guillaume Apollinaire – 2007 and The Poetical Calling Prize – 2004).
She lives in Paris, France.

Member of the Académie Mallarmé since 2013.

Her poems have been published in 25 countries.

Biography
 Member of the Mallarmé Academy (Académie Mallarmé), France since May 2013
 General secretary of the most important poetry prize in France - Guillaume Apollinaire Prize since 2013
 Editor-in-chief of the French-English literary review La traductière, Paris, France since June 2013 
 Associate editor of the scientific review "Cinematographic Art & Documentation", Hyperion University, Bucharest, since 2010
 Member of the jury of the Prix Max-Pol Fouchet (Max-Pol Fouchet Poetry Prize), France (2010 – 2012)
 Poetry editor of the literary review Seine et Danube, Paris (2009 - 2010)
 Assistant Secretary of the La Nouvelle Pléiade Association in Paris since 2009
 Cultural Ambassador of Romania during the European Cultural Season, France, 2008
 Assistant Secretary of the Romanian Literature Translators' Association in Paris since 2006
 Initiator and co-organiser of the Festival Le Printemps des Poètes/Primavara Poetilor (Spring of Poets Festival) in Romania (2005), in the Republic of Moldavia (2006) and in Australia (2007)
 Founder and director of the literary review VERSUs/m – Bucharest 2005
 Member of the Romanian Writers' Union since 2002
 Assistant Professor (Senior Lecturer), France since 2012
 General secretary of the Collège de Littérature comparée ("The College of Comparative Literature") - Paris, since 2011
 PhD in Comparative Literature - Paris-Sorbonne University (summa cum laude) and University of Bucharest, 2011
 Postgraduate student in Comparative Literature at the Paris-Sorbonne University, Paris IV
 Student at the Paris-Sorbonne University, Paris IV – Modern Literature
 Pupil at the Central School in Bucharest and at the Victor Duruy High school in Paris (France)

Literary prizes
 Top poetry prize Nichita Stănescu - Writers' Union of Moldavia, 2013
 Ion Minulescu National Poetry Prize, Romania – 2008
 Prix Guillaume Apollinaire (The Apollinaire Prize) for La Maison en lames de rasoir, Cheyne éditeur, France – 2007
 Prix de la Vocation (The Poetical Calling Prize) for Le Livre de signes et d'ombres, Cheyne éditeur, France – 2004
 Translation Prize of the International Academy Mihai Eminescu, Romania – 2002
 Translation Prize Les Plumes de l'Axe, France – 2001
 The Poetry Prize of the Cultural Commission of the Paris-Sorbonne University, Paris IV, France – 2001

Literary works
She made her debut in 1988 with a poem published in a literary review from Bucharest.

Poetry
  (The Highway A4 and other poems), Cheyne éditeur, France, 2009, 
  (The House Made of Razor Blades), Cheyne éditeur, France, 2006, republished in 2008
  (The Book of Signs and Shadows), Cheyne éditeur, France, 2004. 
  (The Poem with a Wild Boar Head), Vinea Publishing House, Bucharest, 2003
  (The Sunset is Far Away, Rip off His Ribbon!), Bucharest, 2001.

Poems of Linda Maria Baros in translation
 De autosnelweg A4 en andere gedichten (The Highway A4 and other poems), translated by Jan H. Mysjkin, Poeziecentrum, Belgium, 2014 
 Bārdasnažu asmeņu nams (The House Made of Razor Blades), translated by Dagnija Dreika, Daugava, Riga, Latvia, 2011 
 Къща от бръснарски ножчета (The House Made of Razor Blades), translated by Aksinia Mihailova, Foundation for the Bulgarian Literature Publishing House, Sofia, Bulgaria, 2010 
 Casa din lame de ras (The House Made of Razor Blades), Editura Cartea Româneasca, Bucharest, Roumanie, 2006 
 Il est loin le soleil couchant, arrache-lui le ruban ! (The Sunset is Far Away, Rip off His Ribbon!), AMB, Bucharest, 2003 

Baros' poems were published in over 25 countries, in anthologies and literary reviews, as, for example, Pleiades (United States of America) or Poetry Review, Horizon Review (England).

Her poems have also been published in Canada, Germany, Spain, Italy, Belgium, Switzerland, Netherlands, Luxembourg, Mexico, Serbia, Macedonia, Slovenia, Bulgaria, Albania, Croatia, Ukraine, Republic of Moldavia, Latvia, Morocco, Bangladesh, Iran, Japan, Finland etc.

In 2011, the "Arthur Rimbaud" Museum in France commissioned Canadian sculptor Michel Goulet to engrave some of Linda Maria Baros' lines of poetry on an objet d'art made of stainless steel.

Baros took part in over 500 poetry readings and in over 50 poetry festivals.

Drama
 Marile spirite nu se ocupă niciodată de nimicuri (Great Spirits never Deal with Trifles), The Romanian Literature Museum Publishing House, Bucharest, 2003
 A venit la mine un centaur... (A Centaur Came to My Place...), META, Bucharest, 2003. This play was also published in French – Un centaure est venu chez moi..., Bucharest, 2002.

Literary studies
 Passer en carène (To Careen), The Romanian Literature Museum Publishing House, Bucharest, 2005
 Les Recrues de la damnation (The Recruits of Damnation), The Romanian Literature Museum Publishing House, Bucharest, 2005

Translations
Over 30 books: she translated from Romanian into French poetry by Nichita Stănescu, Angela Marinescu, Marta Petreu, Ioan Es. Pop, Mircea Bârsila, Floarea Țuțuianu, Magda Cârneci, Simona Popescu etc. From French/English/Spanish/Dutch, she translated into Romanian poetry by Henri Michaux, Boris Vian, Guy Goffette, Collette Nys-Mazure, José Luis Reina Palazón, Maria Antonia Ortega, Jan H. Mysjkin or novels by Alphonse Daudet, Johanna Spyri, James Oliver Curwood etc.
 In 2008, she created La Bibliothèque Zoom, a virtual library that includes 140 authors.

She also published some anthologies of poetry:
  (Anthology of Contemporary Romanian Poetry. 1990-2013, 13 authors), Tracus Arte, 2013).
  (The Apocalypse of Marta), Marta Petreu, Editions Caractères, France, 2013
  (I Heal with My Tongue), Floarea Țuțuianu, Editions Caractères, France, 2013.
  (I Eat my Lines), Angela Marinescu, Éditions L’Oreille du Loup, France, 2011
  /  (No Exit), Ioan Es. Pop, Éditions L’Oreille du Loup, France, 2010
  (20 authors - Anthology of Contemporary Romanian Poetry) in Confluences poétiques, no. 3, France, 2009 
  (The Unwords and Other Poems), Nichita Stănescu, Éditions Textuel, France, 2005 
  (The Order of Fire), Collette Nys-Mazure, AMB, Romania, 2005

Reviews
She collaborates with poetry, literary criticism and translations at the reviews:
Poetry Review, Horizon Review (England), Pleiades, International Notebook of Poetry (USA), Contre-jour, Langage & créativité (Canada), Po&sie, Aujourd'hui poème, NUNC, Poésie 2003, Europe, Seine et Danube, La Revue littéraire, Pyro, Confluences poétiques, Ici & Là, MIR, La traductière, Hauteurs, Littérales, Le Capital des mots, Thauma, L’Écho d’Orphée, Le Bateau Fantôme, La page blanche, Levure Littéraire (France), Observator München, Galateea (Germany), Bunker Hill (Netherlands), Alora, la bien cercada, El Coloquio de los Perros, ABC (Spain), Poëziekrant, Deus ex machina, Le Journal des Poètes, Langue vive, Revolver (Belgium), Scritture Migranti, Formafluens  (Italy), La Revue de Belles Lettres (Switzerland), Le Quotidien, Tageblatt, Le Jeudi (Luxembourg), Poetika, Zlatna greda, Književni list, Gradina (Serbia), Lirikon 21 (Slovenia), 'România literară', Viata românească, Luceafărul, Ziua literară, Arges, Calende, Tribuna, Familia, Apostrof, Astra, Noua literatură, Conta, Arca (Romania), Électron libre (Morocco), Shirdanra (Bangladesh), Beagle (Japan) etc.

Schoolbooks
The poem The Mine Horses was included into Limba si literatura română. Manual de clasa a XII-a (Romanian language and literature. 12th-grade schoolbook), Paralela 45 Publishing House, 2007, Bucharest, Romania.

Anthologies
Baros' poems were published in over 40 anthologies, as:
 Liberté de créer, liberté de crier (Freedom to create, freedom to shout), Editions Henry, Paris, France, 2014
  (Book of Poetry 2013), Editura Lumina, Republic of Moldavia, 2013
 L’alveare d’oro dell’invisibile, Contact international, Romania, 2013
 VERSschmuggel/réVERSible, CD, Wunderhorn & La passe du vent, Germany/France, 2012
 Resistenze bruciate.  Da Angela Marinescu a Linda Maria Baros (Burned Resistors. From Angela Marinescu to Linda Maria Baros), anthology, Edizioni Akkuaria, Italy, 2012 - 11 poets
 Alchimie des ailleurs, album, Musée Arthur Rimbaud & Silvana Editoriale, France/Italy, 2012
 Pas d’ici, pas d’ailleurs (Not From Here, Not From Elsewhere), anthology, Éditions Voix d’encre, France, 2012
  (Romanian Poets at Crossroads: Continuity and Rupture), anthology, Scrisul românesc, Romania, 2012 - 25 poets
 Zeitkunst. Internationale Literatur (International Literature), anthology, Verlagshaus J. Frank & Edition Polyphon, Germany, 2011
 Les Très riches heures du Livre pauvre ("The Very Rich Hours of the Poor Book"), album, Éditions Gallimard, France, 2011
 Anthologie de la poésie érotique féminine contemporaine de langue française ("Anthology of the Contemporary Female Erotic Poetry of French-language"), France, 2011
 The International Days and Nights of Literature, Uniunea Scriitorilor din România, 2011
 "Europski glasnik" (The European Messenger), Hrvatsko drustvo pisaca, Zagreb, Croatia, 2010
 Runoilevien naisten kaupunki (The City of Women Poets), Tammi, Helsinki, Finland, 2010
 Cheyne, 30 ans, 30 voix (Cheyne, 30 years, 30 voices ), Cheyne, France, 2010
 Poezia antiutopica (Anti-Utopian Poetry. An Anthology of Contemporary Romanian Poetry), edited by Daniel D. Marin, Paralela 45, Romania, 2010
 Couleurs femmes, Le Castor Astral & Le Nouvel Athanor, France, 2010
 Anthologie de la poésie amoureuse, edited by Marc Alyn, Écriture, France, 2010
 "Entre estas aguas : poetas del mundo latino 2009" (Between These Waters: Poets of the Latin World 2009), Monterrey, Mexico, 2010
 Kijk, het heeft gewaaid, Poetry International, Rotterdam, Pays-Bas, 2009
 Ailleurs 2008. Une année en poésie, Musée Arthur Rimbaud, Charleville-Mézières, France, 2009
 Poésies de langue française. 144 poètes d'aujourd'hui autour du monde (French-language poets. 144 Today Poets from all over the World), Éditions Seghers, France, 2008
 Poëzie van dichters uit de hele wereld. Poetry International 2008 – Anthology of the Poetry International Festival from Rotterdam, Netherlands, 2008
 Dicisiete poetas franceses. Antología de poesía francesa contemporánea (Seventeen Contemporary French Poets. Anthology of French Contemporary Poetry), edited by Lionel Ray, Lancelot, Spain, 2008
 Voix de la Méditerranée 2008 (Mediterranean Voices 2008), Éditions Clapas, France, 2008
 Literatura tânără 2007 (Young Literature 2007), The Romanian Writers' Union, Romania, 2007
 VERSUs/m – Zoom 2007, Exigent Publishing House, Romania, 2007
 L'année poétique 2005 (The Poetical Year 2005), by Patrice Delbourg and Jean Luc Maxence, Éditions Seghers, France, 2006

Translation scholarships
 "VERSschmuggel", Berlin (Germany), 2011
 Vertalershuis (Translators' House), Amsterdam (Netherlands), 2007
 Centre de Recontres Abbaye Neumünster (Luxembourg), 2006
 The 3rd Poetry Translation Workshop The Golden Boat (Slovenia), 2005
 Collège Européen des traducteurs littéraires de Seneffe (Belgium), 2003

International festivals
 Cork Spring Poetry Festival, Cork, Ireland, 2014
 Acadie Rock, Moncton, New-Brunswick, Canada, 2013
 Festival acadien de poésie, Caraquet, New-Brunswick, Canada, 2013
 Voix de la Méditerranée, Lodève, France, 2013
 Biennale de la poésie / Poètes du monde, Saint-Quentin-en-Yvelines, France, 2013
 , Chisinau & Soroca, Republic of Moldavia, 2013
 Le Festival franco-anglais de poésie, France, 2013
 Printemps des Poètes, France, 2013
 Littératures Etrangères Festival, Audincourt, France, 2012
 Novi Sad International Festival, Serbia, 2012
 Voix de la Méditerranée, Lodève, France, 2012
 Zeitkunst Festival, Berlin, Germany, 2011
 International Festival Encuentro de Poetas del Mundo Latino, Mexico, 2011
 Poesiefestival, Berlin, Germany, 2011
 Voix de la Méditerranée, Lodève, France, 2011
 The International Days and Nights of Literature, Neptun, Romania, 2011
 Le Festival MidiMinuitPoésie, Nantes, France, 2010
 La Biennale Internationale de Poésie, Liège, Belgium, 2010
 Voix de la Méditerranée, Lodève, France, 2010
 Le Festival International de Poésie Wallonie-Bruxelles, Namur, Belgium, 2010
 Le Festival franco-anglais de poésie, France, 2010
 Printemps des Poètes, France, 2010
 À vous de lire, France, 2010
 DécOUVRIR, Concèze, France, 2010
Biennale de la poésie, Saint-Quentin-en-Yvelines, France, 2009
Paris en toutes lettres, France, 2009
Le Festival International de la Poésie, Trois-Rivières, Canada, 2008
 Poetry International, Rotterdam, Pays-Bas, 2008
 European Voices, France, 2008
 Voix de la Méditerranée, Lodève, France, 2008
 Primavera dei Poeti, Italy, 2008
 Le Printemps Balkanique. Insolite Roumanie, France, 2008
 Le Mar de Letras, Cartagena, Spain, 2008
 World Poetry Day, Belgrade, Serbia, 2008
 Printemps de Poètes, Luxembourg, 2008
 Le Festival Dacia – Méditerranée, France, 2007
 Lectures sous l'Arbre, France, 2007, 2009
 Printemps de Poètes, France, 2007, 2008, 2009, 2010, 2012, 2013
 Festival International de Poésie Teranova, France, 2006
 Odyssey International Festival, Amman, Jordan, 2005
 La Biennale Internationale de Poésie, Liège, Belgium, 2005
 Le Festival International de Poésie, Rabat, Morocco, 2004
 Festivalul Internațional de Literatură, Neptun, Romania, 2001

Bibliography
 Passages et ancrages en France. Dictionnaire des écrivains migrants de langue française (1981-2011) (Crossings and Anchors in France. The Dictionary of Migrant Writers of French-Language (1981-2011)), Ursula Mathis-Moser and Birgit Mertz-Baumgartner (ed.), Editions Honoré Champion, Paris, France, 2012 .
 Les obsessions poétiques de Linda Maria Baros (Linda Maria Baros' Poetic Obsessions), in Écrivains d'expression française de l'Europe du sud-est ("Writers of French-Language from South-Eastern Europe"), Editura Fundatiei România de Mâine, Romania, 2010, 
 Un cas de révélation bien maîtrisée ("A Case of Well Controlled Revelation"), in L’Escabeau dans la bibliothèque (''The Ladder in the Library"), Paul Aretzu, Fundatia Culturala Ideea Europeana, Romania, 2007,

References

External links
Official website
Poetry
poetry in Horizon Review – England
Cork Spring Poetry Festival – Ireland
Poetry International – webpage on Linda Maria Baros 
The Spring of Poets Festival – webpage on Linda Maria Baros
poems in French
Library ZOOM – 140 writers translated and published by Linda Maria Baros
Member of the Mallarmé Academy

1981 births
Living people
Writers from Bucharest
21st-century French poets
French translators
French literary critics
French women literary critics
French people of Romanian descent
University of Paris alumni
Romanian poets
Romanian women literary critics
Romanian translators
Romanian expatriates in France
Romanian writers in French
Translators from Romanian
Translators to French
Translators to Romanian
Translators from French
Translators from Spanish
French women poets
21st-century French women writers
Romanian women poets
21st-century translators
Prix Guillaume Apollinaire winners